The third season of The Voice Brasil, premiered on Rede Globo on September 18, 2014 in the 10:30 p.m. (BRT/AMT) slot immediately following the primetime telenovela Império.

The 22- and 24-year-old sertanejo duo Danilo Reis e Rafael won the competition on December 25, 2014 with 43% of the votes cast. This marked Lulu Santos' first win as a coach, the first stolen artist to win a Brazilian season of The Voice, and the first time in any The Voice franchise that a duo won the competition.

Selection process

Auditions

Online applications for The Voice Brasil were open on December 26, 2013 from April 13, 2014.

The selected applications were then called to regional auditions held in seven capital cities across Brazil:

Coaches and host
All four coaches return for their third season. Tiago Leifert, the host of the show, also returned. Comedian Miá Mello was replaced by actress Fernanda Souza as the show's social media correspondent.

Rogério Flausino and Luiza Possi both returned as team advisors for Team Brown and Team Daniel, while Di Ferrero and Dudu Nobre replaced Gaby Amarantos and Maria Gadu as team advisors for Team Lulu and Team Claudia.

Twists

In the dark auditions
During the blind auditions, some candidates will perform behind a red curtain. This curtain will only open if any coach turn his/her chair for the artist, making it possible for the public (as well the other coaches) to see the contestant.

Second chance
For the first time, selected contestants who failed to turn any chairs in previously two seasons will be given a second chance this season.

Teams
Color key

Blind auditions
Color key

Episode 1
Aired: September 18, 2014
 Group performance: The Voice Brasil Coaches ("Toda Forma de Amor")

Episode 2
Aired: September 25, 2014
 Coach performance: Claudia Leitte ("It Hurt So Bad")

Episode 3
Aired: October 9, 2014
 Coach performance: Daniel ("Evidências")

Episode 4
Aired: October 16, 2014
 Coach performance: Carlinhos Brown ("Verdade, Uma Ilusão")

Episode 5
Aired: October 23, 2014
 Coach performance: Lulu Santos ("Luiz Maurício")

The Battle rounds
Color key

Episode 6
Aired: October 30, 2014
 Group performance: The Voice Brasil Coaches ("A Namorada")

Episode 7
Aired: November 6, 2014
 Guest performances: Di Ferrero & Rogério Flausino ("Só Rezo"), Dudu Nobre & Luiza Possi ("Maneiras")

Episode 8
Aired: November 13, 2014
 Guest performances: Dudu Nobre & Rogério Flausino ("Verdade"), Di Ferrero & Luiza Possi ("Lucky")

Live shows
The live shows is the final phase of the competition. It consists of the playoffs, three weekly shows and the season finale.

Viewers in the Amazon time zone (Acre, Amazonas, Rondônia and Roraima) are cued to vote to save artists on the show's official website during the delayed broadcast.

Artist's info

Result details

Color key:

Episode 9
Aired: November 20, 2014
Live Playoffs 1

Episode 10
Aired: November 27, 2014
Live Playoffs 2

Episode 11
Aired: December 4, 2014
Round of 16

Episode 12
Aired: December 11, 2014
Quarterfinals
 Coach performance: Lulu Santos ft. Mr. Catra ("Michê"), Carlinhos Brown ft. Luiz Caldas ("Por Causa de Você")

Episode 13
Aired: December 18, 2014
Semifinals
 Coach performance: Daniel ft. Guilherme Arantes ("Meu Mundo e Nada Mais"), Claudia Leitte ft. MC Guimê (Matimba")

Episode 14

Ratings

Brazilian ratings
All numbers are in points and provided by IBOPE.

 In 2014, each point represents 65.000 households in São Paulo.
Notes
 Episode 5 was delayed 1-hour in 13 states + Federal District due to the second round of Governor's debate on Globo and affiliates in these regions.

References

External links
Official website on Globo.com

3
2014 Brazilian television seasons